Eagle Mills is an unincorporated community in Vinton County, in the U.S. state of Ohio.

History
A post office called Eagle Mills was established in 1856, and remained in operation until 1917. The community took its name from Eagle Mills, a mill on Salt Creek. Eagle Mills contained a school until 1962.

References

Unincorporated communities in Vinton County, Ohio
Unincorporated communities in Ohio